Ningnan County is a county in the south of Sichuan Province, China, bordering Yunnan province to the east. It is under the administration of the Liangshan Yi Autonomous Prefecture.

Climate

References

 
Liangshan Yi Autonomous Prefecture
Amdo
County-level divisions of Sichuan